Pamela Jiles Moreno (born 30 November 1960) is a Chilean journalist and politician, currently serving as a member of the Chamber of Deputies, representing District 12 of the Santiago Metropolitan Region.

Throughout her career, Jiles has gained attention for her confrontational personality. She has gained the nickname "Abuela" (Grandma).

Biography 
Jiles studied journalism at the Pontifical Catholic University of Chile. She began working as journalist in the 1980s on several magazines against Augusto Pinochet's dictatorship, such as Solidaridad, Apsi and Análisis.

In the 1990s, Jiles began working in Informe Especial (Special Report), an investigative journalism program of Televisión Nacional de Chile (TVN). While at TVN, she worked at programs such as Mujeres al borde de..., Siempre Lunes, Unas y otras, Contigo en verano (1997) and En debate (2001).

Jiles left TVN in 2001, and began working as celebrity critic in Vértigo (Canal 13) in 2004, where she – along with José Miguel Villouta and Gloria Simonetti – coined the term "opinólogo" (opinologist), to name those who talk about celebrities on television.

In 2005, Jiles started to work at TVO, where she conducted Pamela Chile. That year, she appeared in television commercials for Tomás Hirsch's presidential candidacy. Shortly after that, on 14 November, TVO fired her for "unethical conduct." Between 2006 and 2008, Jiles worked as panelist in Sálvese Quien Pueda in Chilevisión.

In February 2009, Jiles announced her presidential candidacy in The Clinic, a left-leaning satirical Chilean magazine, using "Somos millones los Jiles" (We are millions of Jiles – in Spanish the similar-sounding giles means idiots) as her slogan. In July 2009, Alejandro Navarro, the Broad Social Movement candidate, announced his presidential candidacy in company of Jiles; this was interpreted to mean that Jiles withdrew her candidacy, but she later denied it on her website. However, shortly after that she stepped out of the presidential race and instead ran for a seat in the Chamber of Deputies on Navarro's list of candidates, without success.

In November 2017, representing the Humanist Party in conjunction with the political coalition "Frente Amplio", Jiles won the Chamber of Deputies elections on her respective district (District 12) along with another six candidates, including Camila Vallejo.

In July 2020, after the approval of a government project in which citizens would be allowed to withdraw up to 10% of their privately-held retirement savings, Jiles celebrated by running through congress with her arms spread out behind her, imitating the move of many characters of the Japanese anime Naruto.

She's the granddaughter of politician, lawyer and feminist activist Elena Caffarena.

Bibliography 
Crimen bajo Estado de sitio (with María Olivia Mönckeberg and María Eugenia Camus), 1986.
Poesías sexuales, La Nación, 2004.
Fantasías sexuales de mujeres chilenas, 2004.
Confesiones sexuales de hombres chilenos, Editorial Grijalbo.
Maldita farándula, Editorial Catalonia, 2007.

Notes

References

External links 
  
 Official YouTube channel

1960 births
Living people
Chilean women journalists
Chilean people of Italian descent
Pontifical Catholic University of Chile alumni
Chilean women writers
Women members of the Chamber of Deputies of Chile
Members of the Chamber of Deputies of Chile
Humanist Party (Chile) politicians
Chilean television personalities